The Volkswagen Concept D is a concept luxury liftback designed by Ferdinand Piëch, which was unveiled at the 1999 International Motor Show Germany before going on public display.

The vehicle featured a V10 TDI diesel engine (offering 230 kW/313 bhp at 4000 rpm and 750 Nm torque), six-speed Tiptronic, 4Motion all-wheel drive, air suspension with adaptive damping and Bi Xenon headlamps. It was essentially a five-door prototype of the luxury sedan, the Volkswagen Phaeton, which debuted in 2002.

References

External links

Volkswagen Corporate Website
Moss Bros Volkswagen Website

Concept D
Cars introduced in 1999
Luxury vehicles
Hatchbacks
Sports sedans
All-wheel-drive vehicles